Nizhnyaya Vayenga is a rural locality (a village) in Vinogradovsky District, Arkhangelsk Oblast, Russia. The population was 9 as of 2010. There are 3 streets.

Geography 
Nizhnyaya Vayenga is located on the Vayenga River, 16 km northeast of Bereznik (the district's administrative centre) by road.

References 

Rural localities in Vinogradovsky District